The discography of English electronic music group Fluke consists of five studio albums, one live album, three compilation albums, a white label promo album, twenty-two singles; of which eighteen were released on label and seven are white label and/or promotional only singles.

The discography also lists remixes that the group as produced for other artists and music released by the group under the alias The Lucky Monkeys. Releases by other groups that also involve Fluke (2 Bit Pie, Beauty School and Syntax) are listed on their individual pages.

Albums
The following is a list of all albums by Fluke, sorted into albums released on label, live albums and white label/promotional albums. The right-hand column of this section lists all of the albums chronologically.

Studio albums released on label
The Techno Rose of Blighty (1991, Creation Records)
Six Wheels on My Wagon (1993, Circa) – UK #41
Oto (1995, Circa) – UK #44
Risotto (1997, Circa/Virgin/Astralwerks) – UK #45
Puppy (2003, One Little Indian)

Live albums
Out (In Essence) (1991, Circa/Virgin)

Compilation albums
The Peel Sessions (1994, Strange Fruit)
Progressive History X (2001, Circa)
Progressive History XXX (2002, Circa)

White label/Promotional only albums
Xmas Demos (2000, Virgin)

Albums listed chronologically
The Techno Rose of Blighty (1991, Creation Records)
Out (In Essence) (1991, Circa/Virgin)
Six Wheels on My Wagon (1993, Circa)
The Peel Sessions (1994, Strange Fruit)
Oto (1995, Circa)
Risotto (1997, Circa/Virgin/Astralwerks)
Xmas Demos (2000, Virgin)
Progressive History X (2001, Circa)
Progressive History XXX (2002, Circa)
Puppy (2003, One Little Indian)

Singles
The following is a list of all singles by Fluke, sorted into singles released on label and White Label/Promotional singles. There are some overlaps between the two categories where singles were released only promotionally but not on white label. The right-hand column of this section lists all of the singles chronologically.

Singles released on label
"Thumper!" (1989)
"Joni/Taxi" (1990)
"Philly" (1990)
"The Bells" (1991)
"Slid" (1993) – UK #59
"Electric Guitar" (1993) – UK #58
"Groovy Feeling" (1993) – UK #45
"Bubble" (1994) – UK #37
"Bullet" (1995) – UK #23
"Tosh" (1995) – UK #32
"Atom Bomb" (1996) – UK #20
"Absurd" (1997) – UK #25
"Squirt" (1997) – UK #46
"Absurd: The Remixes" (2001)
"Slap It" (2002) – UK #119
"Pulse" (2002) – UK #127
"Hang Tough" (2003) – UK #149
"Switch" (2003) – UK #192

White label/Promotional only singles
"Island Life" (1988)
"The Bells" (1991)
"Absurd: The Remixes" (2001)
"Slap It" (2002)
"Slid/Timeless Land (Wrecked Angle Mixes)" (2003)
"Slid (King of Cool Remixes)" (2004)
"Bullet 2005" (2005)

Singles listed chronologically
"Island Life" (1988)
"Thumper!" (1989)
"Joni/Taxi" (1990)
"Philly" (1990)
"The Bells" (1991)
"Slid" (1993)
"Electric Guitar" (1993)
"Groovy Feeling" (1993)
"Bubble" (1994)
"Bullet" (1995)
"Tosh" (1995)
"Atom Bomb" (1996)
"Absurd" (1997)
"Squirt" (1997)
"Absurd: The Remixes" (2001)
"Slap It" (2002)
"Pulse" (2002)
"Hang Tough" (2003)
"Slid/Timeless Land (Wrecked Angle Mixes)" (2003)
"Switch" (2003)
"Slid (King of Cool Remixes)" (2004)
"Bullet 2005" (2005)

Remixes
This is a list of remixes that Fluke have produced for other artists.

Aliases and related artists

Discographies of bands who; contain all members of Fluke, contain any of the members of Fluke or are Fluke under a different name.

2 Bit Pie

Beauty School

The Lucky Monkeys
Singles
"All Aboard" (1990, Self-Released/Lafayette)
"Bjango" (1996, Polydor/Hi Life Recordings)

Syntax

References

Discographies of British artists
Pop music group discographies